Bruno Tonioli (born 25 November 1955) is an Italian choreographer, ballroom and Latin  dancer, and Television personality. He is a judge on ITV's Britain’s Got Talent and Dancing with the Stars on ABC TV in the USA. He has also judged on the British television dance competition Strictly Come Dancing. Tonioli co-created and appeared on the BBC talent show DanceX and American adaptation, Dance War: Bruno vs. Carrie Ann.

Career
In 1980, as part of the group Duke and the Aces, Tonioli performed in but did not win the United Kingdom's competition to select an entry for the Eurovision Song Contest.

Tonioli has worked in the music business as a choreographer for music videos, stage shows, and tours for artists such as Tina Turner, Sting, Elton John, the Rolling Stones, Freddie Mercury, Sinitta, Boy George, Dead or Alive, Bananarama, and Duran Duran.  He danced in the Elton John video for "I'm Still Standing" (1983).

Tonioli choreographed the band Arcadia's music video for their song "Election Day" as documented in a 1980s documentary entitled The Making of Election Day. He was the choreographer for Ella Enchanted Minnie Driver.

Tonioli's commentary style often includes colourful descriptives. As examples, during his time with the U.S. Dancing With the Stars, Tonioli called Cheetah Girl Sabrina Bryan "a little lynx on the prowl" and labelled singer and actor Billy Ray Cyrus "a crazy bear lost in a swamp".

A minor controversy arose following Tonioli's remarks to U.S. Dancing With the Stars contestant Michael Bolton and dance partner Chelsie Hightower on the 27 September 2010 after show, when the judge called Bolton's jive dance the worst he had seen in all 11 seasons. Bolton expressed his dissatisfaction prominently in the media afterward, prompting ABC to release a statement defending Tonioli.

In 2016, a surprise challenge saw Tonioli work with Jodie Sweetin and season 22 (U.S.) eventual-winner Nyle DiMarco and their professional partners.  During the sequence, the two celebrities swapped partners, seeing DiMarco and Keo Motsepe dance the tango in ballroom hold, with both men shirtless, and Mostsepe lift and twirl DiMarco.  This was the first time a same-sex pairing danced in any franchise of the show.

In November 2016, Tonioli lent his name to an album released by Decca entitled An Italian Romance – a compilation of Italian songs by various artists selected by Tonioli. The cover of the album was shot by John Mac.

In November 2018, Tonioli presented the BBC Radio 2 series Bruno Tonioli at the Opera.

On 24 June 2021, it was announced that Anton Du Beke would replace Tonioli as a permanent judge on Strictly Come Dancing for series 19. It was then announced on 19 May 2022 that Tonioli would not be returning to Strictly, and that Du Beke would take over permanently.

In October 2022, Tonioli competed in the second series of The Masked Dancer as Pearly King. He was in third place.

On Christmas Day 2022, in the Strictly Come Dancing Christmas Special, Tonioli surprised viewers by singing "Don't Leave Me This Way" by The Communards. Reactions to the performance were mixed.

In January 2023, Tonioli joined the judging panel on British talent show Britain's Got Talent.

Public image
In 2009, Rolling Stone magazine said that Tonioli had "won America's heart with his gay-Italian-maniac steez."

Filmography

Personal life
Tonioli is fluent in five languages: Italian, English, Portuguese, Spanish, and French. He has lived in London since 1975.

Tonioli is gay and has spoken of the homophobic bullying he suffered in his youth.

References

External links
 Judges' biography at BBC Strictly Come Dancing site 
 Biography at ABC Dancing with the Stars site
 Dancing With The Stars: Is Michael Bolton Over-Reacting? at KRTH-FM
 

1955 births
Living people
Dance teachers
Italian gay men
Italian choreographers
Italian emigrants to the United Kingdom
Italian male dancers
Italian television personalities
Italian LGBT broadcasters
LGBT choreographers
Gay dancers
Italian LGBT entertainers
People from Ferrara
21st-century Italian LGBT people
Judges in American reality television series